Louis Gluck (1924–1997) was an American neonatologist who made many important contributions to the care of newborns, and who is considered "the father of neonatology."

Career overview 
Gluck designed the modern neonatal intensive care unit (NICU); developed protocols which reduced spread of serious bacterial infections in newborns; and developed a laboratory test, called the L/S ratio, which accurately predicted the chance that a newborn would develop infant respiratory distress syndrome.

He received over 35 national and international awards for his work in the field of neonatology. He is a member of the Rutgers University Hall of Distinguished Alumni.

References

American neonatologists
1924 births
1997 deaths